The Centennial Covered Bridge is a covered bridge in Cottage Grove in the U.S. state of Oregon. It spans the Coast Fork Willamette River alongside Main Street, carrying only bicycle and pedestrian traffic. It was built in 1987, the hundredth year since the founding of the city. Constructed mostly by volunteers, it was made from timbers salvaged from the Meadows and Brumbaugh bridges, which were dismantled in 1979.

See also
 List of Oregon covered bridges
 List of Registered Historic Places in Lane County, Oregon

References

External links
 Covered bridge history of Cottage Grove

Covered bridges in Lane County, Oregon
Bridges completed in 1987
Cottage Grove, Oregon
Pedestrian bridges in Oregon
Former road bridges in the United States
Road bridges in Oregon
1987 establishments in Oregon
Wooden bridges in Oregon